The following is a timeline of the history of the city of St. Petersburg in Pinellas County, Florida, United States.

Late 19th century

1875 – John C. Williams purchases land.
1884 – The St. Petersburg Times was established.
1888 
Peter Demens brings railroad into St. Petersburg.
The first hotel is built, named the Detroit Hotel.
1892 
Town of St. Petersburg incorporated.
David Moffett becomes first mayor of St. Petersburg.
1897 – Electrical service established.
1899
Orange Belt Railway constructs the Railroad Pier.
Henry W. Hibbs introduces major fishing business.
1900 – Population: 1,575

20th century
1903 – City of St. Petersburg incorporated.
1904 – Trolley services enter St. Petersburg by F. A. Davis.
1906
The Electric Pier is built, replacing the Railroad Pier.
Shipping channel dredging begins.
1910 – Population: 4,127
1913 – The Municipal Pier is built, replacing the Electric Pier.
1914
St. Louis Browns invited to use St. Petersburg for spring training at Coffee Pot Park.
The St. Petersburg-Tampa Airboat Line perform the first commercial flight with a Benoist XIV flying boat.
1915 – Mirror Lake Library opens.
1916 – Al Lang becomes mayor.

St. Petersburg–Tampa Airboat Line
A Benoist XIV was used for flights. 

1920 – Population: 14,237
1921
St. Petersburg Museum of History is founded.
1921 Tampa Bay hurricane.
1924
The United States Coast Guard opens base.
Gandy Bridge opens.
1925 – The Vinoy Park Hotel is built.
1926 – Millions Dollar Pier is constructed, replacing the Municipal Pier.
 1928 – WSUN radio begins broadcasting.
1930 – Population: 40,425
1940 – Population: 60,812
1942 – St. Petersburg used a training facility for the Army Air Force.
1947 – Original Al Lang Stadium is built.
1950 – Population: 96,738
 1953 – WSUN-TV (television) begins broadcasting.
1954 – The original Sunshine Skyway Bridge opens.
1960 
Population: 181,298.
Howard Frankland Bridge is constructed.
1965
Museum of Fine Arts is established.
Bayfront Center is constructed.
 1968 – Roman Catholic Diocese of Saint Petersburg established.
1970 – Population: 216,159.
1973 – The St. Petersburg Pier is built.
1976 – Al Lang Stadium is rebuilt.
1980
Population: 238,647.
The south bound span of the Sunshine Skyway Bridge collapses due to the MV Summit Venture striking a pier.
1982 – Salvador Dalí Museum is established.
1987 – The new Sunshine Skyway Bridge is constructed.
1990 
Population: 238,629.
Tropicana Field is constructed.
One Progress Plaza is constructed.
1992 – Florida Holocaust Museum is established.
1993 – Original Sunshine Skyway Bridge is demolished.
1998 – Tampa Bay Rays established as Tampa Bay Devil Rays.
2000 – Population: 248,232

21st century
2001 – Rick Baker becomes mayor.
2003 – Wikimedia Foundation established.
2003 – First ever St. Pete Pride celebration and declaration of June being Pride month 
2004 – Bayfront Center is demolished.
2010
Population: 244,769
Bill Foster becomes mayor.
2009 – Signature Place is constructed.
2011 – Salvador Dalí Museum is established in current building.
2014 – Rick Kriseman becomes mayor.
2015 – The St. Petersburg Pier is demolished.
2015 – The History Council of St. Petersburg is formed.
2017 – Rick Kriseman is re-elected as mayor.
2020 – St. Pete Pier opens.

See also
 List of mayors of St. Petersburg, Florida
 History of St. Petersburg, Florida
 National Register of Historic Places listings in Pinellas County, Florida
 Timelines of other cities in the Central Florida area of Florida: Clearwater, Lakeland, Largo, Orlando, Tampa

References

Bibliography
 

saint petersburg